Copper Blue is the debut studio album by American alternative rock band Sugar. It was voted 1992 Album of the Year by the NME. All of the songs were written by guitarist/vocalist Bob Mould, who also co-produced with Lou Giordano. Musically, the band continues the thick punk guitar of Mould's previous band, Hüsker Dü, while slowing the tempo and emphasizing melody even more.

Background
During the 1980s, Bob Mould was the guitarist and a lead vocalist of the rock band Hüsker Dü. Initially rooted in hardcore punk, Hüsker Dü eventually developed a sound based around alternative rock, with an emphasis on melody. When Hüsker Dü disbanded in 1987, Mould continued as a solo artist, and released two albums in 1989 and 1991. His debut solo album in particular, Workbook, eschewed the hardcore sound that had previously defined his career, and instead featured a lighter sound with folk influence.

In 1991, Nirvana released its seminal album Nevermind, which was in part responsible for bringing alternative rock and grunge to mainstream popularity. The popularity of Nevermind and its grunge sound had a profound impact on Mould. In an interview with NPR, Mould said: "When Nevermind came out, that album changed the way people listen to music. A lot of the songs that I had been writing in 1991 led up to my next group, Sugar — and had it not been for Nevermind, I don't know if Sugar's Copper Blue would have stood a chance in '92. But people were now receptive to this sound." Around this time, Mould lost the publishing rights to his solo albums, and was dropped from Virgin Records. This necessitated a nine-month solo tour throughout Europe. During this tour, Mould wrote and performed new songs to see how people reacted.

Mould described the music he wrote on tour as "more melodic and immediate than on the other solo records". He had written over thirty songs for a third solo album, and recorded a home demo tape. After some recommendations from one of his friends, Mould signed with Rykodisc and Creation Records, who would release his next album in the United States and Europe respectively. Mould then began looking for studio musicians, and recruited bassist David Barbe and drummer Malcolm Travis in late 1991. He also hired Lou Giordano to produce the album at the Outpost in Stoughton, Massachusetts. The band's name came from a sugar packet Mould noticed while eating at a diner with the other two members.

Release and reissues

A limited edition initial run of the CD was released by Rykodisc in a front-and-back metal copper sleeve with each of the 2,500 copies containing a one-of-a-kind Polaroid photo taken by one of the three band members and stamped on the back with "Sugar Copper Blue Summer '92."

Several tracks were recorded for this album, but were not included. Mould decided to release them separately as an EP entitled Beaster.

Rykodisc released a remastered version pressed on 180-gram vinyl on June 21, 2011. It is accompanied by a drop card for a free download of the digital version.

On July 24, 2012, the album was reissued by Merge Records as a 3-disc set containing the full album accompanied by B-sides (disc 1), the Beaster EP (disc 2), and a 1992 live performance at the Cabaret Metro (disc 3).

Copper Blue Tour
In August 2012, Bob Mould and his band embarked on a "Copper Blue Tour", playing the album in its entirety at several European and American venues.

Legacy
"The last word in love songs," enthused NME, "and the full stop after heartbreak."

The album was included in the book 1001 Albums You Must Hear Before You Die.

It was voted number 699 in the third edition of Colin Larkin's All Time Top 1000 Albums (2000).

Track listing
All songs written by Bob Mould

Personnel
Credits adapted from the liner notes of Copper Blue.
Sugar
 Bob Mould – guitars, vocals, keyboards, percussion
 David Barbe – bass
 Malcolm Travis – drums, percussion

Production
 Lou Giordano – production, engineering
 Bob Mould – production, engineering
 Tom Bender – mixing
 Howie Weinberg – mastering

Charts

Albums

Singles

References

External links
 Bob Mould, "Talking about 'Hoover Dam,'" One Track Mind, The A.V. Club. Video.

1992 debut albums
Sugar (American band) albums
Albums produced by Lou Giordano
Albums produced by Bob Mould
Rykodisc albums
Creation Records albums
Power pop albums by American artists